Waione Siding was very briefly a stop on the North Island Main Trunk line, in the Ruapehu District of New Zealand in the Ōngarue valley. It was also known as Ninia.

It served a Marton Sash & Door Company tramway and was also a stop for occasional excursion trains. From 1928 the tramway was operated by a Price 16-wheeler steam locomotive. In 1927 a shelter shed was built. It was  damaged by fire in 1950. In 1929 the siding became a tablet station, at a cost of about £4430.

The siding served a small settlement, where 23 people voted in 1928 and 22 in 1935. In 2013 meshblock 1042000, which includes the area west of the railway, had a population of 30 in 6 houses.

References 

Railway stations in New Zealand
Ruapehu District
Rail transport in Manawatū-Whanganui
Buildings and structures in Manawatū-Whanganui
Railway stations opened in 1917
Railway stations closed in 1948